Oliver Charles Harvey, 1st Baron Harvey of Tasburgh  (26 November 1893 – 29 November 1968) was a British civil servant and diplomat.

Life 
Harvey was the son of Sir Charles Harvey, 2nd Baronet. He was educated at Malvern College.

Diplomatic career 
He joined the Diplomatic Service as a Third Secretary in 1920, after being admitted under open competition in September 1919. He advanced to Second Secretary from  15 December 1920, to First Secretary from 22 October 1926, and Counsellor from 21 January 1936.  He was appointed a Commander of the Order of St Michael and St George in the 1937 Coronation Honours.

He was appointed a Companion of the Order of the Bath in the 1944 New Year Honours following his service as Principal Private Secretary to the Secretary of State. He served as Deputy Under-Secretary of State for Foreign Affairs from 1946 to 1948 and as Ambassador to France from 1948 to 1954. He was appointed a Knight Commander of the Order of St Michael and St George in the 1946 Birthday Honours (and promoted to Knight Grand Cross of that Order in the 1948 New Year Honours) and Knight Grand Cross of the Royal Victorian Order in the 1950 Birthday Honours.

On 3 July 1954 he was raised to the peerage as Baron Harvey of Tasburgh, of Tasburgh in the County of Norfolk. Four months later he succeeded his half-brother as fourth Baronet, of Crown Point.

Personal life 
Lord Harvey of Tasburgh married Maud Annora, daughter of Arthur Watkin Williams-Wynn, in 1920. He died in November 1968, aged 75, and was succeeded in his titles by his son Peter. Lady Harvey of Tasburgh died in 1970.

Lord Harvey and Maud Annora (née Williams Wynn) had issue:

 Peter Charles Oliver Harvey, 2nd Baron Harvey of Tasburgh (b. 28 Jan 1921, d. 18 Apr 2010)
 Hon. John Wynn Harvey (b. 4 Nov 1923, d. 21 Sep 1989)

Lord Harvey's diaries are housed at the British Library. The diaries can be accessed through the British Library catalogue.

Notes

References
Kidd, Charles, Williamson, David (editors). Debrett's Peerage and Baronetage (1990 edition). New York: St Martin's Press, 1990, 

 

1893 births
1968 deaths
Diplomatic peers
Knights Grand Cross of the Order of St Michael and St George
Knights Grand Cross of the Royal Victorian Order
Companions of the Order of the Bath
Ambassadors of the United Kingdom to France
People educated at Malvern College
Principal Private Secretaries to the Secretary of State for Foreign and Commonwealth Affairs
Members of HM Diplomatic Service
People from South Norfolk (district)
Hereditary barons created by Elizabeth II
20th-century British diplomats